Stenoptilia is a genus of moths in the family Pterophoridae.

Species
The genus contains the following species:

Stenoptilia admiranda Yano, 1963
Stenoptilia aethiopica Gibeaux, 1994
Stenoptilia aktashiensis Gibeaux, 1997
Stenoptilia alaii Gibeaux, 1995
Stenoptilia albilimbata Yano, 1963
Stenoptilia amseli Arenberger, 1990
Stenoptilia annadactyla  Sutter, 1988
Stenoptilia aridus  (Zeller, 1847) 
Stenoptilia atlanticola Zerny, 1936
Stenoptilia balsami Arenberger, 2010
Stenoptilia bandamae Bigot, 1964
Stenoptilia bassii Arenberger, 2002
Stenoptilia bipunctidactyla  (Scopoli, 1763) 
Stenoptilia caradjai Gibeaux, 1995
Stenoptilia caroli Arenberger, 1988
Stenoptilia cercelegica Fazekas, 2003
Stenoptilia coenei Gielis, 2000
Stenoptilia columbia  McDunnough, 1927
Stenoptilia coloradensis  Fernald, 1898
Stenoptilia conicephala Gielis, 1990
Stenoptilia convexa Arenberger, 1998
Stenoptilia coprodactylus  (Stainton, 1851) 
Stenoptilia dolini Arenberger, 2007
Stenoptilia dubatolovi Ustjuzhanin, 2001
Stenoptilia eborinodactyla  Zagulajev, 1986
Stenoptilia elkefi  Arenberger, 1984
Stenoptilia etcetera Arenberger, 1998
Stenoptilia exclamationis  (Walsingham, 1880) 
Stenoptilia friedeli  Arenberger, 1984
Stenoptilia grandipuncta  McDunnough, 1939
Stenoptilia graphodactyla  (Treitschke, 1833) 
Stenoptilia gratiolae  Gibeaux & Nel, 1990
Stenoptilia hahni  Arenberger, 1989
Stenoptilia harhorina Fazekas, 2003
Stenoptilia himachala Arenberger, 1999
Stenoptilia inexpectata Gibeaux, 1995
Stenoptilia ionota Meyrick, 1920
Stenoptilia islandicus  (Staudinger, 1857) 
Stenoptilia jacutica Ustjuzhanin, 1996
Stenoptilia johnistella Ustjuzhanin et Kovtunovich, 2010
Stenoptilia karsholti Gielis, 1995
Stenoptilia kiitulo Gielis, 2008
Stenoptilia kirghizica Zagulajev, 2002
Stenoptilia kosterini Ustjuzhanin, 2001
Stenoptilia kurushensis Kovtunovich, 2001
Stenoptilia latistriga Rebel, 1916
Stenoptilia leuconephes  (Meyrick, 1886) 
Stenoptilia lucasi  Arenberger, 1990
Stenoptilia lutescens  (Herrich-Schäffer, 1855) 
Stenoptilia luteocinereus  (Snellen, 1884) 
Stenoptilia madyana Arenberger, 1999
Stenoptilia mannii  (Zeller, 1852) 
Stenoptilia melanoloncha Meyrick, 1927
Stenoptilia mengeli  Fernald, 1898
Stenoptilia meyeri Gielis, 1997
Stenoptilia millieridactyla  (Bruand, 1861) 
Stenoptilia mimula  Gibeaux, 1985
Stenoptilia molleti Gibeaux, 1991
Stenoptilia murzini Gibeaux, 1995
Stenoptilia naryna Arenberger & Buchsbaum, 2000
Stenoptilia natalensis Ustjuzhanin et Kovtunovich, 2010
Stenoptilia neblina Gielis, 1995
Stenoptilia nepetellae  Bigot & Picard, 1983
Stenoptilia nolckeni  (Tengström, 1869) 
Stenoptilia nurolhaki  Amsel, 1967
Stenoptilia orites  (Meyrick, 1884) 
Stenoptilia pallistriga  Barnes & McDunnough, 1913
Stenoptilia parnasia  Arenberger, 1986
Stenoptilia pelidnodactyla  (Stein, 1837) 
Stenoptilia petraea  Meyrick, 1908
Stenoptilia phaeonephes  (Meyrick, 1886) 
Stenoptilia pinarodactyla  (Erschoff, 1877) 
Stenoptilia pinkeri Arenberger, 1984
Stenoptilia platanodes Meyrick, 1914
Stenoptilia pneumonanthes  (Büttner, 1880) 
Stenoptilia poculi Arenberger, 1998
Stenoptilia pterodactyla  (Linnaeus, 1761) 
Stenoptilia reisseri  Rebel, 1935
Stenoptilia rougeoti Gibeaux, 1994
Stenoptilia saigusai Yano, 1963
Stenoptilia sanaa Arenberger, 1999
Stenoptilia scoprodactyla  Zagulajev, 1986
Stenoptilia stigmatodactylus  (Zeller, 1852) 
Stenoptilia stigmatoides  Sutter & Skyva, 1992
Stenoptilia suprema  Meyrick, 1926
Stenoptilia tenuis  (Felder & Rogenhofer, 1875) 
Stenoptilia transversata Gibeaux, 1995
Stenoptilia tyropiesta Meyrick, 1932
Stenoptilia veronicae  Karvonen, 1932
Stenoptilia viettei  Gibeaux, 1994
Stenoptilia wagneri  Zerny, 1940
Stenoptilia zophodactylus  (Duponchel, 1840)

Species of unknown status
Stenoptilia nivea Sahlberg, 1912
Stenoptilia stenodactyla Turati & Fiori, 1930, described from Greece.

References
Stenoptilia at funet

 
Platyptiliini
Moth genera